Adaptation, in biology, is the process or trait by which organisms or population better match their environment

Adaptation may also refer to:

Arts
 Adaptation (arts), a transfer of a work of art from one medium to another
 Film adaptation, a story from another work, adapted into a film
 Literary adaptation, a story from a literary source, adapted into another work
 
 Theatrical adaptation, a story from another work, adapted into a play
 Adaptation (film), a 2002 film by Spike Jonze
 "Adaptation" (The Walking Dead), a television episode
Adaptation, a 2012 novel by Malinda Lo

Biology and medicine
 Adaptation (eye), the eye's adjustment to light
 Chromatic adaptation, visual systems' adjustments to changes in illumination for preservation of colors
 Prism adaptation, sensory-motor adjustments after the visual field has been artificially shifted 
 Cellular adaptation, changes by cells/tissues in response to changed microenvironments
 High-altitude adaptation, organisms and their specializations for life in high altitudes
 Neural adaptation, the responsiveness of a sensory system to a constant stimulus
 The SAID principle, a sports training concept, standing for "Specific Adaptation to Imposed Demands"

Communication technology
 ATM adaptation layer, information transfer protocols that support Asynchronous Transfer Mode
 Content adaptation, transforming content to adapt to device capabilities, particularly in mobile devices 
 Link adaptation, Adaptive coding and modulation in wireless communication

Control and information theory

 Adaptation (computer science) by which interactive systems adapt to individual users and environments
 Adaptive system, a set of interacting entities that enable the whole to improve its response
 Complex adaptive system, rich interactions between elements that result in feedback and adaptation
 Domain adaptation, a field associated with machine learning and transfer learning

Human sciences

 Behavioral adaptation, an adjustment to another type of behavior or environmental context
 Hedonic adaptation, the ability of preserving at a stable level of happiness despite better or worse changes in the personal material life
 Psychological adaptation, a mind and body interaction which results from  competitive or cooperation types of evolution
 Preconditioning (adaptation), a general concept in which an entity is exposed to some type of stress or reinforcement stimulus, in order to become more resilient when and if that external factor would happen anytime in the future

Other uses
 Climate change adaptation
 Ecosystem-based adaptation